Abayantsev (masculine) or Abayantseva (feminine) is a Russian last name, a variant of which is  (masculine) or  (feminine). It derives from the demonym "" or, in dialects with akanye, "", meaning one from Oboyan.

References

Notes

Sources
И. М. Ганжина (I. M. Ganzhina). "Словарь современных русских фамилий" (Dictionary of Modern Russian Last Names). Москва, 2001. 

Russian-language surnames